Ephraim Geoffrey Peyton (1802 – after 1876) was a judge of the High Court of Errors and Appeals of Mississippi from 1868 to 1870 and a justice of its successor, the Mississippi Supreme Court, from 1870 to 1876 including as chief justice.

Peyton was born near Elizabethtown, Kentucky in 1802. His ancestors were from Virginia. He was sent to college at Gallatin, Tennessee, but left school at age 17 and moved to Natchez, Mississippi with an older brother. There he obtained employment as a printer and later secured a small school in the forests of Wilkinson county where he began and prosecuted the study of law. In 1825 he obtained his license from the supreme court at Natchez. He filled his saddlebags with law books and went into the interior to practice, locating at Gallatin, Mississippi (which had been settled by pioneers from Gallatin, Tennessee) in Copiah County, Mississippi.

He established a large mercantile house at Grand Gulf, Mississippi. He served one session in the legislature and then persistently refused to compete for any political office. In 1839 he was elected district attorney. He was a zealous Whig in politics and earnestly opposed secession. He became a Republican after the American Civil War and was appointed to Mississippi’s supreme court by General Adelbert Ames, and upon the reorganization of the court under the constitution of 1869, was again appointed by Governor James L. Alcorn. In 1870 he became chief justice, and held the position until the Democrats came into power at the end of the Reconstruction era in 1876. He was an accomplished lawyer and an able and impartial jurist and enjoyed the respect and esteem of the profession to the end, regardless of party fealty.

On February 25, 1868, General Alvan Cullem Gillem, who had been given post-Civil War command over a region including Mississippi, named Peyton to the state supreme court, along with Elza Jeffords and Thomas Shackelford. Peyton resigned in 1876.

References

1802 births
People from Elizabethtown, Kentucky
People from Claiborne County, Mississippi
Mississippi Republicans
Mississippi Whigs
Members of the Mississippi Legislature
Chief Justices of the Mississippi Supreme Court
Date of death unknown